Oru Pakka Kathai is a 2020 Indian Tamil language romantic comedy film written and directed by Balaji Tharaneetharan. It stars Kalidas Jayaram and Megha Akash. The movie is produced by K.S. Sreenivasan  under the banner of Vasan's Visual Ventures. It released on ZEE5 on December 25, 2020.

Plot

Meera and Saravanan appear as lovers who decide to marry after graduation. Both had their parents' blessings. In their conservative society, intimacy begins before marriage. Then Meera gets pregnant. This causes panic among the couple and their respective family members. Doctors diagnosed her condition as parthenogenesis. In layman's terms, she became pregnant without intercourse as a virgin. Meera’s story goes viral on social media. She becomes the talk of the town. Despite the unwanted attention, Saravanan manages to convince his parents and marries Meera.

Cast 

 Kalidas Jayaram as Saravanan
 Megha Akash as Meera
 P. V. Chandramouli as Meera's Father
Jeeva Ravi as Saravanan's Father
 Chef Damodharan as Lawyer
 Lakshmi Priya Menon as Meera's Mother
 Meena Vemuri as Saravanan's Mother

Production 
After the success of his debut venture, Balaji began pre-production on his second film titled Seethakathi for Vasan's Visual Ventures. After a year of scripting, Balaji announced that he had temporarily shelved the venture and would resume it later (eventually restarted it in April 2017). In August 2014, he subsequently made an official announcement that his next venture would be Oru Pakka Kathai and would feature Kalidas Jayaram, son of actor Jayaram in the lead role. The launch for the movie was held on 1 September 2014 at Prasad Lab in Vadapalani. Kamal Haasan showed up for the event to introduce Kalidas to the audience. Shooting began in December 2014. The film was produced by K. S. Sreenivasan for Visual Ventures.

Release 
The film's distribution rights were bought by ZEE5 after a theatrical release failed to happen. It released on 25 December 2020. Baradwaj Rangan of Film Companion South wrote "Balaji Tharaneetharan may be the gentlest filmmaker in Tamil cinema today. The smallest of plot points is treated with dignity. But the second half needed more work".

References

External links 
 

2020 films
2020s Tamil-language films
ZEE5 original films
Films scored by Govind Vasantha